1792 Naval Air Squadron of the Fleet Air Arm of the Royal Navy was formed on 15 May 1945 at Lee-on-Solent as a night fighter squadron. It was equipped with the Fairey Firefly NF.Mk I, which was fitted with radar in a centre-line container. The squadron joined HMS Ocean in December for service in the Mediterranean. On return to the UK the squadron was disbanded on 17 April 1946.

References

Military units and formations established in 1945
1700 series Fleet Air Arm squadrons